Giáp Sơn is a commune (xã) and village in Lục Ngạn District, Bắc Giang Province, in northeastern Vietnam.

Info on Giáp Sơn
After harvest, lychee, Giáp Sơn Commune us to attend sessions folksongs San Diu ethnic groups between the two social clubs, Giáp Sơn, Lục Ngạn district, Bắc Ninh Lai Giang commune, district Son Duong, Tuyên Quang Province. Over see, hear and see it as "breaking" the one thing that people have long said culture is a "bridge" to every problem ...

Giáp Sơn is a lowland communes of Luc Ngan district, 8 km from downtown districts to the north on highway 31 opposite to the Son district of Bắc Giang. With a total area of 1863.5 ha nature, of which 70% is mountainous, with nearly 850ha of fruit trees, mainly lychee. Population about 8960 people. The commune has 11 villages (three villages in the 135, so the poverty rate is still high 30.7%), with seven ethnic groups; business people 42%, 40% San Diu ethnic groups, ethnic groups the other is 18%.

In recent years, Giáp Sơn has many positive changes in all areas: economic development, lychee care VIETGAP process has a high economic efficiency. Socially significant strides: 6 won the title of village culture, in which four villages the title "Cultural Village" provincial level, four agencies, schools awarded the title of culture, 75% of households the title "Family Culture". The entire population has a stadium, with four women's football team, second team volleyball, 4 badminton team, 7 / 11 villages have playgrounds, yards, sport. Each village has performance teams. Social gain "National Standard" of public health. 02 schools achieved "National Standards". Other hand, political security, social order is maintained. Party, government and mass organizations are active, the title "Clean-strong."

Giáp Sơn had traditionally strong sports movement, the football team, volleyball village of New Farm, Hạ Long have won medals in other competitions at provincial and district levels. The public art team (NTQC) typically must include are: Lim, Camp Page, Hạ Long, particularly for rural areas of Hạ Long NTQC team, the team always won the prize of the NTQC festivals including the provincial level. At times, the team's delegation officials visited Lục Ngạn Island district of Quảng Ninh Co, communicate and perform service staff, district People's islands, they could not believe it is a team of art a "Cultural Village". When Group Co of Lục Ngạn district you would like to visit, and see whether the opposite is the actor was ... And now, what makes the district a considerable learning, which is the establishment of many questions Club ethnic folk songs in all social areas; pioneered in the elderly class that everyone loved, represented by Mr Nguyen Van An, former chairman Lục Ngạn. Recently there have been many visiting journalists write articles, reports, television mirrors reflect this. An addition to his now 70 years old, San Diu ethnic, who was born and raised in the village commune Beo Giáp Sơn, the village has 100% of the San Diu. Also Beo villages, village salts, leads a club village folksongs San Diu, you read the Gospel in the well-established social club of people singing Nung sloong loss. Every year, the village have organized exchanges and social club organized for social interaction with people and inviting people in the district of the same. From the above example, now's the district had 14 clubs ethnic folksongs: San Diu, Tay, Nung, San Chi ... Giáp Sơn Commune formed a social club, regularly exchanges in districts and provinces: Vĩnh Phúc Tuyên Quang and Thái Nguyên and Quảng Ninh. Cultural bridge opened, other provinces and also in the Son Armor establish the club as a social Giáp Sơn-in many ways typical of Lục Ngạn district, one of the villages are at the forefront of implementing resolutions of the Middle The 5th Party Central Committee (VIIIth Congress) on "Construction and development of Vietnam advanced culture, strong national identity", is striving in 2011 the title "Social Culture"; commune's 5th district and contribute actively to the development of "cultural district" will be summarized in 2012. Giáp Sơn is a cultural highlight of the mountainous district of Lục Ngạn.

References
http://lucngan.gov.vn/index.php?option=com_content&view=article&id=293:im-sang-giap-sn&catid=78:van-hoaxahoi&Itemid=227

Populated places in Bắc Giang province
Communes of Bắc Giang province